Tashlykul (Taşlıkül; , Taşlăkül) is a rural locality (a village) in Kebyachevsky Selsoviet, Aurgazinsky District, Bashkortostan, Russia. The population was 250 as of 2010. There are 2 streets.

Geography 
Tashlykul is located 11 km southeast of Tolbazy (the district's administrative centre) by road. Utarkul is the nearest rural locality.

References 

Rural localities in Aurgazinsky District